Kjersti Anita Thun (born 18 June 1974) is a Norwegian former soccer player. Thun played 12 games and scored one goal for Norway, and was on the team that took bronze at the 1996 Summer Olympics in Atlanta.

At club level, she played for the Asker and Konnerud. She was champion with Asker in 2000 and scored a goal in the finals against the Administrator, and in 2005 with two goals in the final against Team Stream. She was also the series' top scorer with Asker in 1999.

References

External links
 
 
 Profile at Fotball.no

Living people
Norwegian women's footballers
Footballers at the 1996 Summer Olympics
Olympic footballers of Norway
Olympic bronze medalists for Norway
Norway women's international footballers
Asker Fotball (women) players
Toppserien players
1974 births
Medalists at the 1996 Summer Olympics
Women's association footballers not categorized by position